Four Fires is a novel written by Bryce Courtenay. It was first published in 2001.

Background to the novel
The title is derived from a quote (unspecified, but possibly of Indigenous Australian origin):

There are four fires of our dreaming

The bushfire of our land's renewal

The war fire of good men killing

The soul fire of a different God

The fires of a consuming love

The novel focuses on the Maloney family, who live in country Victoria. It also deals with many major events and issues in Australian history, as seen through the eyes of, or experienced by, the Maloneys. These include feminism, bushfires and PTSD. The story covers a time period from the late 1940s to 1999.

Plot

The Maloney family live in a Victorian town, Yankalillee, in the Wangaratta-Wodonga area. The family is in many ways dysfunctional, but they are also fiercely loyal to each other and their friends and supporters. They start the novel far down the social ladder, but strive to rise up it, in spite of those who seek to keep them down.

The Maloney family

Tommy; a descendant of Irish Catholic convicts, he is technically the head of the family, although only two of the children were fathered by him. A born 'bushie' who fights in World War II as a Corporal in the Australian army, he is captured after the fall of Singapore. He survives years of hell as a POW and barely survives the Death Marches from Sandakan to Ranau. Back home, physically and psychologically damaged, he alternates between bouts of alcoholism, prison terms for petty theft and 'going bush'. He is a respected bushfire fighter. He tells his horrific wartime story, which he has never told before, to his son Mole.

Nancy is the mother of the family, physically and mentally strong and unafraid to stand up to anyone, even her social 'betters'. In Tommy's (frequent) absences, she runs a garbage business under contract to the shire council. Her children regard her as a 'collapsed catholic' (from Nancy's term: "Lapsed Catholic").

Sarah is the oldest child. A brilliant student, she is accepted into medical school, but becomes pregnant and has to fight to be admitted. She graduates with honours.

Michael aka Mike, has artistic talents and learns the fashion trade in Melbourne. Unable to find a way to promote his unorthodox designs, he moves to London.

Bozonik aka Bozo, has boxing talent and, as a protégé of the town police sergeant, wins a bronze medal at the Rome Olympics.  He joins Nancy in the garbage collecting business, expanding it eventually into a major trucking and passenger transport concern.

Peter aka Mole is the narrator of the novel.  He is Tommy's favourite child and learns bush lore and bush fire fighting from him.  He joins the army and serves in Vietnam as a sergeant/warrant officer. He is decorated for saving an office from certain death under heavy fire.  A brilliant student, he obtains a degree and a doctorate and becomes a university lecturer.  He is reunited with his childhood sweetheart, Anna Dumbrowski, now a respected psychiatrist.

The fifth child is 'Little' Colleen, Tommy's second biological child.

Supporters and friends of the Maloney family

'Big Jack' Donovan, local police sergeant.

Morrie and Sophie Suckfizzle, aka Moishe and Zofia Zuckfizzleski, a Jewish couple who survived the concentration camps in Poland and Germany. Morrie is a former surgeon who requalifies and becomes a respected gynaecologist.
  
Father Crosby, the local Catholic minister, who goes head to head with Nancy regarding her family morals, but is ultimately reconciled with the family.

Karpurika Raychaundhuri aka Mrs. Rika Ray, an Indian-born herbalist, ayurvedic healer and midwife who delivers Sarah's daughter, Lucy Tempelton Moloney. She joins Bozo in the family business.

John Crowe, a childhood friend of Tommy and shire mechanic. He becomes a business partner of Bozo. He is killed in a horrific bushfire.

Lucy Barrington-Stone, wife of a wealthy grazier and pillar of the Country Women's Association. She makes it her personal mission to get Sarah admitted to university.

The novel takes place throughout Australia and in Vietnam, Thailand, Fiji, America, Poland and Italy. Real life figures such as Dawn Fraser, Muhammad Ali and Josef Mengele appear in the novel.

External links

Bryce Courtenay  
 http://www.brycecourtenay.com

ABC Interview with Bryce Courtenay
 http://www.abc.net.au/talkingheads/txt/s1630548.htm

2001 Australian novels
Novels by Bryce Courtenay
Sandakan
Japanese prisoner of war and internment camps
Japanese war crimes
Forced marches
Viking Press books